Műegyetemi Atlétikai és Football Club (English: Technical University Athletics and Football Club) o MAFC is a Hungarian football club from the city of Budapest. It is the oldest still active football club in Hungary, and it currently plays in the II. regional Budapest league. It is the football club of Budapest University of Technology and Economics.

History
The club was founded as Műegyetemi Football Csapat (MFC - Technical University Football Club) by the students of the Budapest Technical University, Alfréd Hajós and Ferenc Gillemot, on the 1st of November 1897. At the time MFC started operating as the second, independent university sports club in the country. Students have considered the club an integral part of the university since its inception, and this fact has been consistently expressed in the name and regulations of the club. The first statute, adopted in 1900, set the goal of spreading and cultivating exercise. It took part in the first official football match between different clubs to be played in Hungary, on the 6th of February 1898, when it won against Budapesti TC 5-0, despite BTC having trained the MFC players in the prior months. The club soon also became involved in athletics, and in 1903 it became known as the Technical University Athletics and Football Club, Műegyetemi Atlétikai és Football Club. It was one of the founders of the Hungarian football league and played in the first season of the Hungarian League in 1901, and it finished third.As a result of the growing sports interest, teacher president Richard Zielinski had built an excellent fencing, wrestling, boxing and target shooting hall in the palace of the new Technical University in Lágymányos, and has contracted a number of excellent coaches: the world boxing champion Bobby Dobbs, the Italian fencing champion Italo Santelli, and the world boxing champion János Weigand. Under the guidance of these renowned experts, MAFC boxers, wrestlers and fencers came to the forefront and joined the swimmig section, which was already famous in Europe in the 1910s. 

With their interest in football, the former founders could not have imagined laying the foundations for a club that could look back on a rich history even a hundred years later.

The club had a merit in introducing and promoting many sports in Budapest. It took active part in the introduction of football, swimming, athletics, boxing, gymnastics, fencing at the beginning of the century, and also in the thirties it still played a big role in national sports.

The members of the club were initiators and fighters in the formation of independent associations in several sports. In recognition of their successful activities in Hungary, several club members have also been elected to the boards of international sports federations. Dr. Leó Donáth and Artúr Kankovszky have made an outstanding contribution to building the reputation of Hungarian sports and MAFC through his activities as Secretary General of the International Swimming Association.

MAFC has been also at the forefront of the development of university and college sports. It played an important role in establishing the College Sports Association and building international university relationships. The club can also claim the organization of the first National College Championship. In terms of international relations, the club had a permanent relationship with the University of Oxford as early as the early 1900s. It later established contacts with higher education institutions in Prague, Berlin, Sofia, Cluj-Napoca, Moscow, Dresden, Tallinn, Karlsruhe and Trieste.

Looking back on the past, MAFC athletes won medals at several Olympics or World Championships, European Championships. In addition, perhaps not as spectacular, measurable, and brilliant as gold medals was the activity that MAFC was doing to get the many tens of thousands of students out of the university learned and mastered in sports.

Name Changes 
1897–1903: Műegyetemi FC
1903–1951: Műegyetemi AFC
1951–1954: Dísz FSE
1954–1955: Budapesti Haladás''
1957–2012: Műegyetemi Atlétikai és Football Club
2012–present: Műegyetemi Atlétikai és Football Club EEDA

See also
Budapest University of Technology and Economics

References

External links
 Profile

Football clubs in Hungary
association football clubs established in 1897
sport in Budapest
1897 establishments in Hungary